San Agustín is a town and municipality in the southern Colombian Department of Huila. The town is located 227 km away from the capital of the Department, Neiva. Population is around 34,000. The village was founded in 1752 by Alejo Astudillo but attacks by indigenous people destroyed it. The present village was founded in 1790 by Lucas de Herazo and Mendigaña.

The mean temperature year round is 18 °C.

San Agustín Archaeological Park

The area is very well known for its pre-Columbian archaeological sites belonging to the ancient San Agustin culture. These sites comprise the San Agustín Archaeological Park, which generates significant revenue to the economy due to the high volume of tourists, both Colombian and foreigners. This site was declared a UNESCO World Heritage Site in 1995.

Gallery

See also
List of megalithic sites

External links

Unesco's website on San Agustin

References

Municipalities of Huila Department
Archaeological parks
Archaeological sites in Colombia
Populated places established in 1752
1750s establishments in the Viceroyalty of New Granada
1752 establishments in South America
Populated places established in 1790
1790s establishments in the Viceroyalty of New Granada
1790 establishments in South America
Tourist attractions in Huila Department
World Heritage Sites in Colombia